The Çandarlı family was a prominent Turkish political family which provided the Ottoman Empire with five grand viziers during the 14th and 15th centuries. At the time, it was the second most important family after the Ottoman dynasty itself.

Background and history 
In contrast to other European monarchies, aside from the Ottoman dynasty, the Ottoman Empire had no aristocracy. There was no difference between the  noble birth and the humble birth and everybody had equal chance to reach high ranks. The only prerequisite for an official appointment was conversion to Islam. However, families like the Çandarlı (or, for example, the Köprülü) were able to gain favor with the royal family, creating multi-generational political dynasties and amassing large amounts of wealth.

The roots of the family can be traced back to the village of Çandar (now called Cendere, part of Ankara Province, Turkey) in Central Anatolia. The family was of Turkoman nomadic Turkish origin. After the foundation of the Ottoman beylik (the precursor to the Ottoman Empire), the family settled in İznik (ancient Nicaea; today in Bursa Province, Turkey). They were the members of Ahi tradition and in the early years of the beylik, one member of the family became kadı (judge) of Bilecik in 1326. Between 1365 and 1499, five members of the family became grand viziers. In a period of 88 years (during the first four between 1365 and 1453), the Çandarlı family held the post for 64 years,  a feat unparalleled in Ottoman history.

Kara Halil Hayreddin Pasha was first judge of Bursa and then the family's first Grand Vizier. 

In the early 15th century, Çandarlı Halil Pasha the Younger a member of the family, had a castle for sultan Murad II built in  Aegean sideside town occupying the site of the ancient Greek city of Pitane, renaming it Çandarlı after his family. Çandarlı is now a resort town in İzmir Province of Turkey.

Decline in 1453 
Sultan Mehmed II disliked his late father's grand vizier Çandarlı Halil Pasha the Younger, whom he had inherited from his father Murad II upon his succession to the throne in 1451. After conquering Constantinople (Istanbul) in 1453, he had Halil executed, making him the first of many grand viziers to be executed. After Halil, four of his grand viziers were of devşirme (i.e. non-Turkish and non-Muslim) origin. There was indeed a rise in slave administrators, who were much easier to control.

Later years 
Although a fifth member of the Çandarlı family (Çandarlı Ibrahim Pasha the Younger) was able to reach the post of grand vizier during the reign of Bayezid II in 1498, the family never fully recovered from the shock of 1453. In later years, two other members of the family also worked for the empire; İsa Pasha (d. 1549) and Halil Bey (d. 1568) served in the imperial bureaucracy, but they were unable to become part of the Sublime Porte, the central imperial government.

List of Grand Viziers from the family

Notes

References

Sources
 
 
 

 
Families from the Ottoman Empire
Turks from the Ottoman Empire
14th-century people from the Ottoman Empire
15th-century people from the Ottoman Empire
Pashas
14th-century Grand Viziers of the Ottoman Empire
15th-century Grand Viziers of the Ottoman Empire